A common market is a free trade area with relatively free movement of capital and services.

The European Economic Community is sometimes referred to as the "Common Market", a regional organisation from 1958 to 1993.

Common market or Common Market may also refer to: 

 European Single Market, referred to as the "European Common Market" prior to 1993
 Common Market (hip hop group)
 Common Market (album)
 Common Market (cocktail)

See also
 European Economic Area
 European Union, an economic-political union
 Internal market (disambiguation)
 Market common (disambiguation)